Collection is the first Japanese studio album and the second studio album overall by South Korean girl group 2NE1. It was released on March 28, 2012 in four different editions: CD plus two DVD+Photobook, CD+DVD, CD+Goods (HMV stores only) and a Regular edition.

Release
The album was released in four different editions:

CD plus two DVD+Photobook edition includes with the album, two DVDs (disc one with Japanese music videos and disc two with a selection of Korean music videos), 24-pages album photobook and a 34-pages special photobook. CD+DVD includes the album, a DVD with Japanese music videos and a 24-pages photobook. CD+Goods includes the album, a face towel and a Logo take out Bag; this version is limited and will be sold only on HMV Japan. The Regular edition includes the album and 24-pages photobook only.

Singles
The album produced two singles. The first is a Japanese version of the song "Go Away". It was released on November 15, 2011 as the group's debut single in Japan. The physical single ranked number 12 in Oricon's Weekly chart.

The song "Scream" served as the album's lead single and was the first original Japanese-language single of the group. It released on the same day as the album, on March 28, 2012, in three different editions. The single contains the song "Scream" and the B-side "Fire", which is a Japanese remake of the group's debut song in South Korea, and is also included in the album. The single debuted at number 7 on the Oricon Daily Singles Chart. The song is the first original Japanese song of the group.

Track listing

 Tracks 1-10 are in Japanese. "Like a Virgin" is performed in the original English. "She's So (Outta Control)" is originally a song of the Japanese hip hop duo m-flo, from the album Square One.

Charts

Oricon

Release history

References

2012 albums
Japanese-language albums
2NE1 albums
Avex Group albums